Phillip Steven Supernaw (born January 30, 1990) is a former American football tight end. He played college football at Ouachita Baptist University. He was signed by the Houston Texans after going unselected in the 2012 NFL Draft. He also played for the Baltimore Ravens, Kansas City Chiefs, and Tennessee Titans.

Early life
Supernaw was born on January 30, 1990, at Vanderbilt Hospital in Nashville to country music singer Doug Supernaw and his wife Trudy. The family moved to the Houston area when Phillip was young because his father believed he could find better success as a singer in Texas. Phillip played high school football at James E. Taylor High School in Katy, Texas.

College career
Supernaw was a four-year starter for Ouachita Baptist University in southwestern Arkansas. He recorded 64 catches for 710 yards and 10 touchdowns during his college career and earned first-team all-Gulf South Conference (2009), second-team all-Gulf South Conference (2010), and second-team All-Great American Conference (2011) honors.

Professional career

Houston Texans
He was signed by the Houston Texans on April 29, 2012 after being unselected in the 2012 NFL Draft. On August 31, 2012, he was released. On September 1, 2012, he re-signed with the team to join the practice squad. He was released by the Texans on May 14, 2014.

Baltimore Ravens
Supernaw signed with the Baltimore Ravens on May 19, 2014. He was called up from the practice squad on September 23, 2014, to fill the roster spot opened up when TE Dennis Pitta was placed on IR for the season with a dislocated hip. On October 7, 2014, the Ravens cut Supernaw to make room for the signing of Ryan Taylor to their roster. The next day, Supernaw was re-signed to the Ravens' practice squad. On October 25, 2014, the Ravens cut Ryan Taylor to make room for the re-signing of Supernaw from the practice squad to their 53-man roster. His first NFL reception for negative two yards took place on November 2, 2014 in a game against the Pittsburgh Steelers. He was released on November 4, 2014, and was re-signed to the practice squad the next day.

Kansas City Chiefs
The Kansas City Chiefs signed Supernaw to their 53-man roster off the Baltimore Ravens' practice squad on November 11, 2014. He was released on December 2, 2014.

Baltimore Ravens (second stint)
On December 3, 2014, Supernaw was re-signed to the Ravens' practice squad. On December 5, 2014, he was promoted to the Ravens active roster. He was released by the Ravens on May 12, 2015.

Tennessee Titans
The Tennessee Titans signed Supernaw on June 2, 2015. In 2015, Supernaw ranked second on the Titans with 14 special teams tackles. In 2016, Supernaw collected career-highs with four receptions and 62 receiving yards and tied for third on the Titans with eight special teams tackles. On March 10, 2017, Supernaw signed a two-year deal with the Titans. On October 8, 2017, Supernaw caught his first NFL touchdown from Matt Cassel in the Titans' 16-10 loss to the Miami Dolphins. In 2017, Supernaw played in all 16 games with three starts and appeared in his first two career postseason contests. He tied a career-high with four receptions for 39 yards.

On August 7, 2018, Supernaw was released by the Titans.

Career statistics

Regular season

Postseason

Personal life
Supernaw is a golf enthusiast and is a 2.0 handicap. On January 26, 2019, Supernaw married Abby Floyd, the former Miss Arkansas USA 2016. Supernaw's father, country music singer Doug Supernaw, died from lung and bladder cancer on November 13, 2020.

References

External links
Houston Texans bio
Baltimore Ravens bio

Living people
1990 births
People from Katy, Texas
Sportspeople from Harris County, Texas
Players of American football from Nashville, Tennessee
Players of American football from Texas
American football tight ends
Ouachita Baptist Tigers football players
Houston Texans players
Baltimore Ravens players
Kansas City Chiefs players
Tennessee Titans players